The Mishash Formation is a Late Cretaceous (Campanian-Maastrichtian) geologic formation in Israel. The formation is correlated with the Duwi Formation of Egypt and the Amman and Ruseifa Formations of Jordan. Mosasaur fossils assigned to Prognathodon currii and pterosaur fossils have been recovered from the formation.

See also 
 List of pterosaur-bearing stratigraphic units

References

Further reading 

 Y. Edelman-Furstenberg. 2008. Macrobenthic community structure in a high-productivity region: Upper Campanian Mishash Formation (Israel). Palaeogeography, Palaeoclimatology, Palaeoecology 261:58-77
 P. Christiansen and N. Bonde. 2002. A new species of gigantic mosasaur from the Late Cretaceous of Israel. Journal of Vertebrate Paleontology 22(3):629-644
 Z. Lewy and H. Cappetta. 1989. Senonian Elasmobranch teeth from Israel, biostratigraphic an paleoenvironmental implications. Neues Jahrbuch für Geologie und Paläontologie - Monatshefte 1989(4):212-222

Geology of Israel
Upper Cretaceous Series of Asia
Campanian Stage
Maastrichtian Stage
Limestone formations
Phosphorite formations
Lagoonal deposits
Shallow marine deposits
Paleontology in Israel